Westheimer may refer to:

A surname:
 David Westheimer (1917–2005), American novelist
 Frank Henry Westheimer (1912–2007), American chemist
 Gerald Westheimer (born 1924), Australian vision scientist and neuroscientist
 Irvin Ferdinand Westheimer (1879–1980), American founder of the Big Brothers Big Sisters of America
 Joel Westheimer, American professor at the University of Ottawa, son of Ruth Westheimer
 Julius Westheimer (1916–2005), American financial advisor
 Ruth Westheimer (born Karola Siegel, 1928; known as "Dr. Ruth"), German-American sex therapist, talk show host, author, professor, Holocaust survivor, and former Haganah sniper.

A festival:
 Westheimer Street Festival
 Westheimer Colony Art Festival

An airport:
 Westheimer Air Park in Fort Bend County, Texas, United States
 University of Oklahoma Westheimer Airport in Cleveland County, Oklahoma, United States

A road:
 Westheimer Road, in Houston, Texas, United States

An office complex:
 5251 Westheimer

German-language surnames